Dušni Brav ("Soul Ram" (also referred to as Dušno)); refers to a practice of Christianized animal sacrifices amongst the Serbian Orthodox. It involves the ritualistic slaughter of a lamb for a funeral feast (Daća).

It is believed that the sacrifice of the Dušni Brav is meant to pacify and appease the departed's soul.

Description
The practice involves the blood sacrifice of a sheep (душни брав, dušni brav) to the soul of the deceased. The animal is slaughtered in the deceased's backyard or property, on the day of their funeral or on the 40-day and/or year anniversary (годишњица, "godišnjica") of their death. The sheep must be the same gender as the deceased, and about the same age. No other animal but a white sheep may be sacrificed.

Before the sacrifice, a white cloth is put on top of the sacrificial sheep and a candle is lit. After the sacrifice, the sheep is roasted and prepared, and the white cloth is placed upon it again and it is served with Koliba at the Daća (funeral feast). Before eating the Dušni Brav it is proper etiquette to cross oneself.

See also
 Animal sacrifice
 Christopaganism
 Crucifixion in the Philippines
 Eid al-Adha (Qurbani)
 Folk Catholicism
 Kourbania (in Greece)
 Orthodox memorial service

References

External links
  Култ мртвих. Протођакон Љубомир Ранковић, Верски Обичаји. Retrieved: 2 February 2016.

Animal sacrifice
Serb traditions
History of the Serbian Orthodox Church